Cotton Point Island is a  island in Washington State, a few meters offshore of Cotton Point on Orcas Island. It is part of the San Juan Islands National Monument and owned by Bureau of Land Management, perhaps its smallest holding in Washington.

See also

References

Protected areas of San Juan County, Washington
San Juan Islands
Uninhabited islands of Washington (state)